Kirk Crittendon Speraw (born August 21, 1956) is a former American basketball coach who was most recently an assistant basketball coach at the University of Iowa. Speraw previously served as the head coach for the men's basketball team at University of Central Florida (UCF) from 1993 to 2010, during which UCF made four appearances in the NCAA tournament.

Early life and education
Kirk Crittendon Speraw was born and raised in Sioux City, Iowa. Before Kirk went to high school, his father Eugene "Bud" Speraw was an assistant basketball coach at Sioux City Central High School. Kirk followed his father to Sioux City Central games and helped keep statistics. Kirk later attended Sioux City North High School and lettered in basketball and four other sports, playing at guard on the basketball team.

Graduating in 1975, Speraw turned down scholarships from smaller schools to walk on at the University of Iowa. Playing under head coach Lute Olson, Speraw lettered in the 1977–78 and 1978–79 seasons, during the latter of which Iowa won the Big Ten Conference regular season title and made the NCAA tournament.

Coaching career
After graduating from Iowa in 1979, Speraw joined Olson's staff at Iowa as a graduate assistant. In the 1979–80 season, Iowa made the Final Four.

From 1980 to 1982, Speraw was assistant coach and recruiting coordinator at the University of Denver, then a Division II school, under Floyd Theard. Speraw again coached at the Division II level as an assistant at Florida Southern from 1982 to 1987, including for Florida Southern's third-place finish in the 1986 NCAA tournament.

Speraw got his first head coaching job in 1987 at Pensacola Junior College. In three seasons, Speraw led Pensacola to an 82–21 record and three straight Panhandle Conference titles. In 1990, Speraw was named NABC/Kodak National Junior College Coach of the Year and Florida Junior College Coach of the Year, after Pensacola went 31–7 and finished fifth nationally.

After three seasons at Pensacola, Speraw returned to the Division I level for the first time in a near-decade as an assistant coach at the University of Florida under Lon Kruger and served in that position from 1990 to 1993. Florida made the National Invitation Tournament in 1992 and 1993 and advanced to the 1992 NIT semifinals. Among players Speraw coached at Florida were Andrew DeClercq, who would later play in the NBA.

UCF (1993–2010)
On July 28, 1993, the University of Central Florida (UCF) hired Speraw as its men's basketball head coach. Inheriting a team that finished 10–17 in the previous season, Speraw led UCF to a 21–9 finish, Atlantic Sun tournament title, and the program's debut NCAA Tournament appearance in his first season.

Speraw's most successful season at UCF was 2003–04, when the Knights finished 25–6, received votes for the top 25, won the Atlantic Sun championship, and reached the NCAA tournament.

Conference USA named Speraw the men's basketball Coach of the Year for the 2006–07 season.

On March 15, 2010, UCF fired Kirk Speraw as head basketball coach.

On February 20, 2012, UCF announced that it was vacating its wins from the 2008–2009 and 2009–2010 seasons after it was discovered that there was an ineligible player on the team.

Iowa assistant (2010–2022)
On April 23, 2010, Speraw joined Fran McCaffery's staff at Iowa, Speraw's alma mater.  Following the 2021-2022 season, Speraw announced his retirement from coaching.

Head coaching record

* UCF had its wins from the 2008–09 and 2009–10 seasons vacated after it was ruled that there was ineligible player for the Knights.

Personal life

Speraw is married and has four children.

References

External links
Iowa biography
UCF biography

1956 births
Living people
American men's basketball coaches
Basketball coaches from Iowa
Basketball players from Iowa
Denver Pioneers men's basketball coaches
Florida Gators men's basketball coaches
Iowa Hawkeyes men's basketball coaches
Iowa Hawkeyes men's basketball players
Pensacola State Pirates men's basketball coaches
Sportspeople from Sioux City, Iowa
UCF Knights men's basketball coaches
American men's basketball players
Guards (basketball)
North High School (Sioux City, Iowa) alumni